Housefull is a 1999 Indian Tamil-language thriller film written and directed by R. Parthiepan. The film stars himself along with Vikram, Roja and Suvalakshmi. The film was produced by Parthiban's children under Bioscope Film Framers. The film's score and soundtrack are composed by Ilaiyaraaja. The film has won National Film Award for Best Feature Film in Tamil at 46th National Film Awards

Plot
Parthiban plays Ayya, a respected man who runs a cinema theatre. The story begins when bombs are placed inside the theatre during a movie. Surya and Rattan play police officers who want to defuse the bombs without letting the audience know. Vikram plays a man inside the theatre, and Suvalakshmi the woman outside who loves him.

Ayya's ex-wife (played by Jayanti) does not help when she makes a tear-filled request to him to evacuate the theatre, against the police's advice. By the time Ayya makes a decision, however, Suvalakshmi has snuck in and warned Vikram; others, hearing her words, begin to run out of the theatre. Panic ensues as everyone makes a mad dash for the door.

Ayya helps the audience to get out of the theatre without caring for his own life. Finally when everyone is evacuated, Ayya also comes out of the theatre. Suddenly, the sound of a baby cry is heard inside the theatre. Ayya rushes into the theatre with the hope of saving the baby but the sound is just a scene in the movie that was actually getting played. The bomb explodes and Ayya is dead.

Cast

Parthiban as Ayya
Vikram as Hameed
Roja as Writer
Suvalakshmi as Indhu
Aishwarya as Christine
Swathi as Stella
Jayanthi as Ayya's estranged wife
Vadivelu as Vadivelu
Nair Raman as Theatre manager
Surya as Police commissioner
Laxmi Rattan as Director general of police
J. Prabhakar
S. V. Ramadas as Security guard
Kalidoss as Thamizh
Senbhaga Muthu
Rowdy Rathnam as Rathnam
Baby Sujitha
Mayilsamy as Indigenous man
Bhanusri as Indigenous woman
D. R. K. Kiran as Journalist (uncredited role)
Karu Pazhaniappan as Journalist (uncredited role)
Cheran Raj as Police officer (uncredited role)
Pasupathy as Corrupt cop (uncredited role)
Priyanka as Control room operator (uncredited role)

Production
Parthiban  revealed that he made this film without written script. Every thing from dialogues, shots, etc., are done on the day of the shooting at shooting site. He said this during an interview with Baradwaj Rangan.

Soundtrack
1. En Guruvum - 
Chorus

2. Gypsey Song -
Chorus

3. Indru Engal -
Chorus

4. Unnai Thedi -
Bhavatharini

Reception
K. N. Vijiyan of New Straits Times opined that "Catch this film if you are looking for a story with a difference". A critic from Deccan Herald wrote "Housefull is awfully silly, and seems to serve no other purpose than to show Parthiban, as being capable of political authority". Kalki praised Parthiban for attempting a Speed kind of thriller in Tamil.

References

External links

1999 films
Films scored by Ilaiyaraaja
1990s Tamil-language films
Indian thriller films
Films directed by R. Parthiban
Films about terrorism in India
Films set in a movie theatre
Best Tamil Feature Film National Film Award winners
1999 thriller films